Lupus erythematosus panniculitis  presents with subcutaneous nodules that are commonly firm, sharply defined and nontender.

See also 
 Lupus erythematosus
 List of cutaneous conditions

References

External links

External links 

Cutaneous lupus erythematosus